Dallas Harms (July 18, 1935 – October 12, 2019) was a Canadian country music singer-songwriter. Twenty of Harms' singles made the RPM Country Tracks charts, including the number one single "Honky Tonkin' (All Night Long)". 
Harms was inducted into the Canadian Country Music Hall of Fame in 1989.

Harms was born in Jansen, Saskatchewan, but was raised in Hamilton, Ontario, and was awarded the Hamilton Music Awards Lifetime Achievement Award for 2016. He died in Hamilton on October 12, 2019.

Discography

Albums

Singles

References

External links
 
 Entry at 45cat.com
 45cat.com as The Nashville Sounds Of Dallas Harms And The Spartons

1935 births
2019 deaths
Canadian country singer-songwriters
Canadian male singer-songwriters
Musicians from Saskatchewan
Canadian Mennonites
Mennonite musicians